"The Things We Do for Love" is a song by British band 10cc, released as a single in 1976. It later featured on the album Deceptive Bends released in 1977 and was the group's first release after the departure of band members Kevin Godley and Lol Creme.

Record World called it a "well crafted tune with a crisp, pop sound."

Track listing
UK 7" single
A. "The Things We Do for Love" – 3:32
B. "Hot to Trot" – 4:28

Personnel
Eric Stewart - lead & backing vocals, electric lead guitar, piano, organ
Graham Gouldman - bass, electric & acoustic rhythm guitars, tambourine, handclaps, backing vocals
Paul Burgess - drums, tambourine, handclaps, gong

Chart performance
The song was a hit in various countries worldwide, reaching No. 1 in Canada, as well as peaking at No. 6 in the UK, No. 5 in Australia, No. 13 in the Netherlands, No. 2 in Ireland and No. 5 in the US, where it reached gold status and became the band's best-selling single.

Weekly charts

Year-end charts

Certifications

Amy Grant version

"The Things We Do for Love" was covered by Amy Grant for the soundtrack to the 1996 film Mr. Wrong. Her version reached number 24 on the U.S. Adult Contemporary chart. It was a bigger hit in Canada, where it reached number 41 on the Pop singles chart and number eight Adult Contemporary. It is ranked as the 96th biggest Adult Contemporary hit of 1996.

Charts

Weekly charts

Year-end charts

Tina Arena version

Australian singer Tina Arena released her version in November 2014, with money raised going towards the National Breast Cancer Foundation.

Australian department store David Jones Limited used the song in their 2014 Christmas campaign.

Track listing
1-track download
 "The Things We Do for Love" - 3:08

4-track download
 "Last Christmas" - 3:59
 "The Things We Do for Love"  (pop mix) - 3:21
 "Only Lonely" - 3:22
 "You Set Fire to My Life"  (acoustic mix) - 4:22

Charts

Other versions
The song was covered in 2007 by American alternative rock band Lazlo Bane for their '70s covers album Guilty Pleasures.

References

External links
  (10 CC)

1976 songs
1976 singles
1996 singles
2014 singles
10cc songs
Songs written by Eric Stewart
Songs written by Graham Gouldman
RPM Top Singles number-one singles
Tina Arena songs
Amy Grant songs
Mercury Records singles
A&M Records singles